The following is a list of albums released by now-defunct hip-hop record label Sugar Hill Records.

1980 
Blood Brothers — Blood Brothers
Brother to Brother — Brother 2 Brother
First Class — First Class
Positive Force — Positive Force
The Sequence — Sugarhill Presents the Sequence
The Sugarhill Gang — Sugarhill Gang
Various artists — The Great Rap Hits
Wood, Brass & Steel — Hard & Heavy

1981 
Jack McDuff — Kisses
The Sugarhill Gang — 8th Wonder
Various artists — Greatest Rap Hits Vol. 2
West Street Mob — West Street Mob

1982 
Grandmaster Flash and the Furious Five — The Message
Jack McDuff — Having a Good Time
Harry Ray — It's Good to Be Home
The Sequence — The Sequence
Candi Staton — Nightlites
Trouble Funk — Drop the Bomb
Various artists — Rapped Uptight

1983 
Grandmaster Flash and the Furious Five — Grandmaster Flash & the Furious Five
The Sequence — The Sequence Party
The Sugarhill Gang — Greatest Hits
The Sugarhill Gang — Rappin' Down Town
Treacherous Three — Whip It
Various artists — Sugar Hill Express (The Best Of Rap & Funk)
West Street Mob — Break Dance (Electric Boogie)

1984 
Crash Crew — The Crash Crew
Grandmaster Flash and the Furious Five — Greatest Messages
Grandmaster Melle Mel and the Furious Five — Grandmaster Melle Mel and the Furious Five
Jack McDuff — Live It Up
New Guys On The Block — The New Guys On The Block
The Sugarhill Gang — Livin' in the Fast Lane
Joey Travolta — Hold On
Treacherous Three — The Treacherous Three
Various artists — Street Beats
Philippé Wynne — Philippé Wynne

1985 
Grandmaster Melle Mel and the Furious Five — Stepping Off

References 

Discographies of American record labels